The 311 Boyz was a teen gang in Las Vegas, Nevada, estimated at 140 members, who beginning in the summer of 2003 committed or were suspected of a number of violent acts.   In 2003, the gang consisted mostly of young males who attended Centennial High School and lived in affluent neighborhoods in northwest Las Vegas.

Background 
The group gained notoriety following an incident in July 2003. It was originally reported that this group of teenagers was a gang, and the media continued to use the term even when Judge Michael Cherry later determined the group did not fit the legal definition of a gang. At a party, three teens (Stephen Tanner Hansen, Joseph Grill, Craig Lefevre) in a pickup truck fled from the scene in fear of an altercation. A group of teens gave chase on foot and in other cars after the driver struck the vehicle of a teen boy who was punching the passenger of the pickup truck in the face. The pickup was rammed from behind at least once, and as it attempted to exit the housing subdivision, a gauntlet of teens threw bottles and rocks at the speeding vehicle.  A softball-sized rock went through a window, striking Hansen, one of the passengers, in the arm and head.  Hansen survived: his arm was broken; his face was shattered, requiring metal plates to stabilize the bones; and his vision was permanently impaired in one eye.  As he would later testify, he might have been killed if he hadn't raised his arm and partially deflected the rock.

Nine teens involved in the attack on the pickup would be charged with various criminal offenses, including attempted murder; the charges against one defendant were dropped before any trials.  Of the remaining eight, five pleaded guilty to lesser felony charges, and accepted plea agreements where the prosecution would not seek additional jail time, but on 6 August 2004, District Judge Michael Cherry ignored the prosecution's recommendations and sentenced four of the defendants to a year in detention; the fifth defendant received probation. Two defendants would plead guilty to lesser charges and receive probation; the final defendant, Scott Morris, was acquitted at trial.

Police reports indicated that they suspected Steven Gazlay, one of the four who received jail time, of being the ringleader of the group.  Soon after the charges were filed in the Hansen case, Gazlay was charged with a separate assault at a party in May 2003, where he assaulted another teen with a crowbar.  A jury found him guilty in that case in December 2003. Gazlay was also accused of burning a teen with a red-hot knife and ramming a condominium gate, but as part of Gazlay's plea agreement, those charges were dismissed, and the crowbar assault verdict was set aside.

The ensuing police investigation would discover links between many of the defendants and at least nine assaults in the area, as well as video tapes of fighting between teenagers, taken by another teen.

Origin of name
CBS News speculated that the name might be a coded reference to the Ku Klux Klan: K is the 11th letter of the alphabet, and there are 3 in "KKK".

Criticism
Some research argues that the 311 Boyz phenomenon fits into Stanley Cohen's definition of a media-induced moral panic, with specific reference to The Las Vegas Review-Journal's newspaper coverage of the 311 Boyz incidents. Excessive amounts of highly critical coverage by The Las Vegas Review-Journal may have created the appearance of an imminent danger to the community where little existed. High school boys involved in a violent altercation were presented by news coverage as a unique youth phenomenon and a dangerous new type of gang, one that was savagely and randomly attacking community members. The coverage seems to have employed the classic myth of the violent teen, similar to the mods and rockers, as well as a deviancy amplification spiral.

Those with inside information claim the 311 Boyz weren't a gang and instead were more like a "party crew." They were High School boys who attended High School parties where alcohol was present and would get rowdy. The Review Journal (RJ) attempting to sell newspapers and certain Las Vegas Metropolitan Police Department Detectives used the panic the RJ caused within the North West area of Las Vegas to rise up in rank and standing within the department despite knowing full well that these were drunk rowdy High School kids who threw a rock at a car windshield without thinking about the kind of damage it could cause. It should be noted the 311 Boyz are not and were never a street gang. There was no leader, structure or initiation. If you know a popular male student in the 2003 era of Centennial High School then chances are you also know a one time member of the teen party crew "311 Boyz."  90% of them ended up becoming productive members of society who in High School was thinking about having fun and getting the pretty girl's phone number and had zero thought about committing random acts of violence or terrorizing a community like the RJ claims.

Later work

The group's alleged ringleader, Steven Gazlay, went on to have eight felony convictions by 2019. He was arrested in 2021 for allegedly defrauding a lender for more than $700,000 to fund a gambling spree.

References

External links

 (note: story has incorrect date of 2002-11-19; should be 2003-11-19)

Peckerwood
Street gangs
Gangs in Nevada